Australia competed at the 1906 Intercalated Games in Athens, Greece. Four athletes, all men, competed in nine events in two sports.

Medalists

Athletics

Three athletes represented Australia in 1906 in athletics. Nigel Barker won both of Australia's medals in athletics at these Games.

Ranks given are within the heat.

Swimming

One swimmer, Cecil Healy, represented Australia in 1906.

Ranks given are within the heat.

References

Nations at the 1906 Intercalated Games
1906
Intercalated Games